Nick Ragus (born 19 February 1987) is a Danish professional football midfielder, who currently plays for the Danish club Næsby BK.

References

External links
National team profile
Career statistics at Danmarks Radio

1987 births
Living people
Danish men's footballers
FC Midtjylland players
Danish Superliga players
Viborg FF players
Brabrand IF players
Association football midfielders
Boldklubben 1913 players
Næsby Boldklub players